The AIR Awards of 2007 is the second annual Australian Independent Record Labels Association Music Awards (generally known as the AIR Awards) and was an award ceremony at Toff of the Town, in Melbourne, Australia on 10 December 2007 to honour outstanding achievements in sales by Australian independent artists. Four genre categories were added the list of awards from the previous year and German liquor brand, Jägermeister were named as the sponsor of the event for the first time.

In 2015, Angus of Sneaky Sound System reflected on the night saying "We felt incredibly proud. Being an independent artist we'd put so much time, energy and money into the album so to receive these awards felt really very special. The AIR Awards mean a lot. Platinum awards and chart success and glowing reviews are wonderful of course, but it is just as gratifying to be recognised by your fellow independent artists for the quality of you recordings."

Performers
British India
Ben Winkleman
Urthboy
Blue King Brown

Nominees and winners

AIR Awards
Winners are listed first and highlighted in boldface; other final nominees are listed alphabetically.

See also
Music of Australia

References

2007 in Australian music
2007 music awards
AIR Awards